This Meets That is a studio album by jazz musician John Scofield. Featuring longtime collaborators Steve Swallow on bass guitar and drummer Bill Stewart, along with a four piece horn section. Fellow guitarist Bill Frisell appears on one track.

Critical reception
Jeff Tamarkin of All Music Guide rates it at 4 out of five stars and says, "This Meets That, as its title implies, is less of a thematic album than some of Scofield's more recent endeavors, but it's one that reminds listeners that both his chops and sense of adventure are not only intact but still growing."

Track listing
"The Low Road"
"Down D"
"Strangeness in the Night"
"Heck of a Job"
"Behind Closed Doors"
"House of the Rising Sun"「朝日の当たる家」 (Traditional)
"Shoe Dog"
"Memorette"
"Trio Blues"
"Pretty Out"
"(I Can't Get No) Satisfaction"「(ゲッツ ノー)サティスファクション」 (Mick Jagger, Keith Richards)

Personnel
 John Scofield – guitar
 John Swana – trumpet, flugelhorn
 Jim Pugh – trombone
 Lawrence Feldman – tenor saxophone, flute
 Roger Rosenberg – baritone saxophone, bass clarinet
 Bill Frisell – tremolo guitar
 Steve Swallow – bass guitar
 Bill Stewart – drums

References

2007 albums
Post-bop albums
John Scofield albums